Music from the Motion Picture Save the Last Dance is the first soundtrack album to Thomas Carter's 2001 dance film Save the Last Dance. It was released on December 19, 2000 through Hollywood Records and consisted of hip hop and contemporary R&B music. It features contributions from 112, Athena Cage, Chaka Demus & Pliers, Donell Jones, Fredro Starr, Ice Cube, Jill Scott, K-Ci & JoJo, Kevon Edmonds, Lucy Pearl, Montell Jordan, Notorious B.I.G., Pink, Snoop Dogg, Soulbone, Q-Tip and X-2-C.

The soundtrack made it to several Billboard charts. It peaked at number 3 on the Billboard 200, number 2 on the Top R&B/Hip-Hop Albums, number 6 on the Top Soundtracks, number 3 on the Top Internet Albums and number 2 on the Canadian Albums Chart. It also spawned two charting singles: "Crazy" and "You". The album went both gold and platinum on January 29, 2001 and was certified 2x multi-platinum by the Recording Industry Association of America on May 20, 2002. It won the American Music Award for Favorite Soundtrack in 2002.

Track listing

Notes
The track "Breathe and Stop" (#9) is omitted in many versions of the album and replaced with a bonus track "Shining Through (Theme from Save the Last Dance) (Soulshock and Karlin Remix)" (#14).
"Only You" contains sample from "I Get Lifted" performed by KC and the Sunshine Band.
"Get It On Tonite" contains sample from "Love for the Sake of Love" performed by Claudja Barry.

Awards and nominations

!
|-
|align=center|2002
|Save the Last Dance
|American Music Award for Favorite Soundtrack
|
|

Charts and certifications

Weekly charts

Year-end charts

Certifications

More Music from the Motion Picture Save the Last Dance

More Music from the Motion Picture Save the Last Dance is the second soundtrack album to Thomas Carter's 2001 dance film Save the Last Dance. It was released on May 22, 2001 through Hollywood Records and consisted of hip hop and contemporary R&B music. It features contributions from Angela Ammons, Audrey Martells, Blaqout, Fatman Scoop, Jesse Powell, J.R. Young, Medina Green, Method Man, Redman, Shawty Redd, Sy Smith, Ta-Gana and the World Beaters. The album peaked at number 129 on the Billboard 200.

Track listing

Charts

References

External links

2000 soundtrack albums
Hip hop soundtracks
Romance film soundtracks
Albums produced by Eddie F
Albums produced by J Dilla
Albums produced by Stevie J
Rhythm and blues soundtracks
Albums produced by Sean Combs
Hollywood Records soundtracks
Albums produced by Raphael Saadiq
Albums produced by Sly and Robbie
Albums produced by Babyface (musician)
Albums produced by Battlecat (producer)

2001 soundtrack albums
Albums produced by Rockwilder
Albums produced by Shawty Redd